In Full View is the debut album by country singer-songwriter Victoria Shaw.

Of the 11 tracks here, Shaw co-wrote the first ten (notably, two of those ten with pop songwriter Desmond Child), and wrote the last one by herself.  Four singles were released ("Cry Wolf", "Tears Dry", "Forgiveness", "(A Day in the Life of a) Single Mother"), and all of them placed very low on the US Country chart (57, 74 and 58 for the first three; the last one failed to chart).

Track listing

Personnel
Victoria Shaw: Piano, Vocal
Tony Harrell, John Hobbs, Steve Nathan, Bobby Ogdin: Piano
Pat Buchanan, Steve Gibson, Jess Leary, John Jorgenson, Jeff King, Brent Mason, Danny Parks, Brent Rowan, Michael Spriggs, Biff Watson, John Willis: Guitars
Bruce Bouton: Dobro & Steel
Sonny Garrish, Steve Hinson: Steel Guitar
Glen Duncan: Mandolin
Mike Brignardello, Dave Pomeroy, Michael Rhodes: Bass
David Hungate: Bass, Vocal Backing
Eddie Bayers, Chad Cromwell, Paul Leim: Drums
Terry McMillan: Harmonica, Percussion
Garth Brooks, Gary Burr, Billy Dean, Jess Leary, Mark Luna, Jim Photoglo, Karen Staley, Harry Stinson, Victoria Shaw: Vocal Backing
Bob Mason: Cello

Production
Produced By Andy Byrd & Jim Ed Norman
Engineered By Andy Byrd, Mark Capps, Jon "JD" Dickson, Pat Hutcinson, Patrick Kelly, Fred Mercer, Neal Merrick, Keith Robichaux, Aaron Swihart, John Thomas II & Craig White
Mixed By Chris Lord-Alge, John "JD" Dickson & Terry Christian
Mastered By Denny Purcell

Track information and credits adapted from AllMusic and then verified by the liner notes.

Charts
Singles – Billboard (North America)

References

Reprise Records albums
1995 debut albums
Victoria Shaw (singer) albums
Albums produced by Jim Ed Norman